The Raouval was a French automobile manufactured in Anzin from 1899 until 1902.  Similar in design to Léon Lefèvbre's Pygmée, its power unit was an 8 hp twin of 2851 cc.

References
David Burgess Wise, The New Illustrated Encyclopedia of Automobiles.

Defunct motor vehicle manufacturers of France